This is a list of Academy Award–winning films.

If a film won the Academy Award for Best Picture, its entry is listed in a shaded background with a boldface title.

Competitive Oscars are separated from non-competitive Oscars (i.e. Honorary Award, Special Achievement Award, Juvenile Award); as such, any films that were awarded a non-competitive award will be shown in brackets next to the number of competitive wins.

Statistics 
As of March 1, 2016

 Total number of films: 1,239
 Total number of Best Picture winners: 90
 Total number of awards ceremonies: 90
 Total number of awards associated with a film: 1,948 Competitive + 46 Honorary
 Total number of nominations associated with a film: 4,403
 Total number of Oscar Statuettes awarded: 2,810 Competitive + 49 Honorary = 2,859 in total

Superlatives 
 Films with the most awards: Ben-Hur (1959), Titanic (1997), and The Lord of the Rings: The Return of the King (2003) each earned 11 Academy Awards.
 Films with the most nominations: All About Eve (1950), Titanic (1997), and La La Land (2016) each earned 14 Academy Award nominations.
 Film with the highest clean sweep: The Lord of the Rings: The Return of the King (2003) won all 11 Academy Awards from its 11 nominations.
 Films with the most nominations without a single win: The Turning Point (1977) and The Color Purple (1985) (11 nominations each)
 Film with the most awards without winning Best Picture: Cabaret (1972) won eight Academy Awards from its ten nominations. It lost Best Picture to The Godfather (1972).

References

Films
Lists of films by award